Bartlehiem is a hamlet, located partially in Noardeast-Fryslân, partially in Tytsjerksteradiel, and partially in Leeuwarden. It consists of about 40 houses.

History
In 1840, Bartlehiem was home to 40 people. Before 2018, the village was part of the Leeuwarderadeel municipality and before 2019 part of the Ferwerderadiel municipality.

Monastery 
The village was first mentioned in 1232 as "in Bethlehem". The monastery was named after Bethlehem, Palestina.

Elfstedentocht 
Bartlehiem is especially well-known due to the Elfstedentocht for ice skaters, who have to pass through the hamlet twice. Coming from the west from Feinsum through the Feinsumer Feart, a wide ditch. Skaters then pass the famous wooden bicycle and pedestrian bridge of Bartlehiem, after the bridge they skate north over the Dokkumer Ie to Dokkum. On return they turn left to the east over the Aldtsjerkster Feart, a similar ditch. From here it is approx 10 km to the finish line on the Bonkefeart in Leeuwarden. Due to this, Bartlehiem is the only place where a spectator can see Elfstedentocht-participants from three directions.

Factory 
In 1893 a dairy factory was built but it was closed in the 1950s.
The building was converted to accommodation for people with dementia in 2010.

Gallery

References

External links

Municipality of Noardeast-Fryslân (Official website)
Municipality of Leeuwarden (Official website)
Municipality of Tytsjerksteradiel (Official website)

Noardeast-Fryslân
Leeuwarden
Tytsjerksteradiel
Populated places in Friesland